Lichte is a village and a former municipality in the district of Sonneberg in Thuringia, Germany, close to the Thuringian Rennsteig. Formerly in the district Saalfeld-Rudolstadt, it is part of the town Neuhaus am Rennweg since January 2019.

Geography 
Lichte is located between the towns of Saalfeld (to the north), Oberhof / Ilmenau (northwest) and Sonneberg / Coburg (south) at an altitude of 600 m (NHN), in the centre of the Thuringian Highlands / Thuringian Forest Nature Park. Distinctive sign of Lichte is the railway viaduct established in 1909 (see picture right).

It is a typical Thuringian Forest village, reaching far into the valleys of the Lichte River and of its tributary the Piesau. Both of these feed one of the biggest Thuringian drinking water reservoirs, Leibis-Lichte, with the Deesbach Forebay close to the northern end of the village (in Geiersthal). The Lichte River is also one of the sources of the Schwarza River.

The mountain rivers and streams in the area of the Lichte valley have been known for centuries for deposits of placer gold and are considered the most significant sources of gold in Germany.

Around the steep-sided valleys of the Lichte and Piesau, the height difference between hilltops and valley bottoms is often as much as 200 m, which is large for hills of this size.

History 
Already in 1764 there was porcelain manufacturing in Lichte (Wallendorf). The Wallendorf porcelain manufacture is one of the oldest in Europe. It quickly achieved a growing customer base beyond the then borders of the country. Thus as early as 1822, Johann Heinrich Leder established in Lichte another porcelain company, today’s Lichte porcelain (GmbH). The new company competed with Wallendorf. However, it was able to rapidly find and keep markets of its own, although the two World Wars followed by East German trade restrictions caused setbacks.

Until 1920, the Lichte River was the dividing line between the district of Saalfeld in Saxe-Meiningen in the east and the rural district of Königsee in Schwarzburg-Rudolstadt in the west. In 1952 the municipality was formed by combining several mountain villages: from south to north, Lichte, Wallendorf, Geiersthal and Bock and Teich. From 1922 to 1952, the municipality belonged to the rural district of Saalfeld, from 1952 to 1994 to the district of Neuhaus, and since then has been in the district of Saalfeld-Rudolstadt.

During World War II, Polish forced labourers worked in Wallendorf; four graves in the cemetery there recall this time. A memorial tablet at the Lichte cemetery commemorates two victims of the death march of inmates from the Buchenwald concentration camp in April 1945 who were found in the depths below the rail viaduct.

Heraldry 
The coat of arms of Lichte, a silver candlestick with gold flame and beams of light between 4 silver maple leaves on a field of green, was approved on July 15, 1995. The candlestick is taken from an ancient seal. It thus perpetuates a traditional symbol of the locality and also represents the centuries-long heritage of porcelain manufacturing that typifies Lichte and the region. The maple leaves symbolize the four sections of the municipality using a tree that is typical of the area. They and the green field also symbolize Lichte's location in the forested Thuringian Highland, while the shape at the base of the shield represents its location in valleys.

Politics 
The local government of Lichte and of the former municipal association of Lichtetal am Rennsteig (Lichte Valley on the Rennsteig), which consisted of the municipalities of Lichte, Piesau, Reichmannsdorf, and Schmiedefeld (Lichtetal), were located in the Wallendorf section.

Municipal council 
The municipal council of Lichte consisted of 12 councillors including the mayor, who served in an honorary capacity.

Places of interest 
 Museum of Local History and Culture in Geiersthal
 Lichte-Geiersthal School of Design (founded 1862), in the holiday centre of Lichte-Geiersthal, close to the Feldbachtal Forest Hotel
 Wallendorf Protestant church, built in 1733 in country baroque style
 Piesau viaduct (length 258 m, height 34 m, 10 arches), crossing the Piesau and federal highway 281

Annual events 

 Porcelain Market with coronation of the Porcelain Princess, last weekend in July
 Porcelain Christmas, first day of Advent
 Kermesse – the Lichte Kermesse is the oldest event in Lichte. It is based on a permission granted by the sovereign in 1825 to hold an annual fair on Michaelmas (September 29).

Economy and infrastructure 

The local economy, typically for the Thuringian Highland, is based on tourism, glass and porcelain manufacturing, and woodworking. There has been porcelain manufacturing in Lichte since at least 1764; Wallendorfer Porzellan (Wallendorf Porcelain) is one of the oldest such companies in Europe.

Local enterprises 
 Wallendorfer Porzellan, founded in 1764
 Lichte Porzellan (GmbH), founded in 1822

Notable people associated with Lichte 

 Gotthelf Greiner (1737–1797) co-inventor of "Thuringian porcelain" and founder of the Wallendorf porcelain company
 Carolus Magnus Hutschenreuther (1794–1845), founder of the C.M. Hutschenreuther porcelain company in Hohenberg an der Eger, Bavaria (1814)
 Johann Wolfgang Hammann, co-founder of Wallendorfer Porzellan
 Johann Heinrich Leder, founder of Lichte Porzellan

 Scherf brothers, Louis (1870-1955) and Albert (1876-1953): porcelain painters, silver medal at the World's Fair in Paris in 1900, gold medal at the Louisiana Purchase Exposition in St. Louis (1904)
 Wilhelm Ulbrich, (1848–1922) regional poet and journalist
 Heinz Schaubach (1886–1970), owner of the Wallendorf porcelain company and Schaubachkunst Unterweissbach

See also 
 Cultural monuments in Lichte
 Porcelain manufacturing companies in Europe

References

External links 

 Homepage of the Municipal Association (Verwaltungsgemeinschaft) 

 
Former municipalities in Thuringia
Sonneberg (district)